The Bowl Challenge Cup is a competition among NCAA college football conferences in the Football Bowl Subdivision, formerly called Division I-A, based on win–loss records in the bowl games that take place annually during December and January. The winner is the conference that has the highest winning percentage, among conferences with a minimum of three teams appearing in bowl games.

The Challenge was created in 2002 by ESPN, who also occasionally refers to it as the "Bowl Cup Challenge" when promoting it. Originally sponsored by Cooper Tire, ESPN went several years without a sponsor; since the 2015–16 bowl season, Progressive has been the sponsor.

Participants
The ten Football Bowl Subdivision (formerly Division I-A) conferences that compete in the Bowl Challenge Cup are:

Power Five
 Atlantic Coast Conference
 Big Ten Conference
 Big 12 Conference
 Pac-12 Conference
 Southeastern Conference

Group of Five
 American Athletic Conference
 Conference USA
 Mid-American Conference
 Mountain West Conference
 Sun Belt Conference

Former conferences that competed in the Bowl Challenge Cup were:
 Big East Conference, which reorganized as the American Athletic Conference after the 2012 season
 Western Athletic Conference, which has not sponsored football in FBS since the 2012 season

Results

Italics designate a shared title (tie).

References

College football awards